Dialakoro is a town and sub-prefecture in the Dinguiraye Prefecture in the Faranah Region of western Guinea. As of 2014 it had a population of 14,735 people.

References

Sub-prefectures of the Faranah Region